The Little Engine That Could is an American folktale (existing in the form of several illustrated children's books and films) that became widely known in the United States after publication in 1930 by Platt & Munk. The story is used to teach children the value of optimism and hard work. Based on a 2007 online poll, the National Education Association listed the book as one of its "Teachers' Top 100 Books for Children".

Background

The story's signature phrases such as "I think I can" first occurred in print in a 1902 article in a Swedish journal. An early published version of the story, "Story of the Engine That Thought It Could", appeared in the New-York Tribune on April 8, 1906, as part of a sermon by the Rev. Charles S. Wing.

A brief version of the tale appeared under the title Thinking One Can in 1906, in Wellspring for Young People, a Sunday school publication. This version reappeared in a 1910 book, Foundation Stones of Success.

Another version was published under the name "The Pony Engine" in the Kindergarten Review in 1910, written by Mary C. Jacobs. A different version with the same title appeared in a magazine for children in 1916 under the name of Mabel C. Bragg, a teacher. She introduced new events to the story, such as the train's kid-friendly cargo, but she "took no credit for originating the story".

The story first appeared in print with the title The Little Engine That Could in 1920, collected in Volume I of My Book House, which is a set of books sold in the U.S. by door-to-door salespersons. The Book House version began, "Once there was a Train-of-Cars; she was flying across the country with a load of Christmas toys for the children who lived on the other side of the mountain." The story was labeled  "As told by Olive Beaupré Miller"; the first edition gave credit to Bragg, but subsequent editions did not as Miller subsequently concluded that "the story belonged to the realm of folk literature". Miller was the founding editor and publisher of The Book House for Children, a company based in Chicago. 

The best known incarnation of the story The Little Engine That Could was written by "Watty Piper" in 1930, a pen name of Arnold Munk, who was the owner of the publishing firm Platt & Munk. Munk used the name Watty Piper as both an author of children's books and as the editor of many of the books that Platt & Munk published. He personally hired Lois Lenski to illustrate the book. This retelling of the tale The Pony Engine appeared in 1930, with a title page that stated: "Retold by Watty Piper from The Pony Engine by Mabel C. Bragg's copyrighted by George H. Doran and Co."

In 1954, Platt & Munk published another version of The Little Engine That Could, with slightly revised language and new, more colorful illustrations by George and Doris Hauman. Although there had been many previous editions of this classic story, "It was the work of George and Doris Hauman that earned The Little Engine the title of being worthy to sit on the same shelf as Alice's Adventures in Wonderland." A 1976 rework that featured art by Ruth Sanderson received a lot of attention at the time of its release, in part because it prompted a discussion of gender stereotypes.

Plot
In the tale, a long train must be pulled over a high mountain after its locomotive breaks down. Larger locomotives, treated anthropomorphically, are asked to pull the train; for various reasons they refuse. The request is sent to a small engine, who agrees to try. Despite the steep climb and heavy load, the engine slowly succeeds in pulling the train over the mountain while repeating the motto: "I-think-I-can".

The story of the little engine has been told and retold many times. The underlying theme is the same—a stranded train is unable to find an engine willing to take it on over difficult terrain to its destination. Only the little engine is willing to try and, while repeating the mantra "I think I can, I think I can", overcomes a seemingly impossible task.

An early version goes as follows:

A little railroad engine was employed about a station yard for such work as it was built for, pulling a few cars on and off the switches. One morning it was waiting for the next call when a long train of freight-cars asked a large engine in the roundhouse to take it over the hill. "I can't; that is too much a pull for me", said the great engine built for hard work. Then the train asked another engine, and another, only to hear excuses and be refused. In desperation, the train asked the little switch engine to draw it up the grade and down on the other side. "I think I can", puffed the little locomotive, and put itself in front of the great heavy train. As it went on the little engine kept bravely puffing faster and faster, "I think I can, I think I can, I think I can."

As it neared the top of the grade, which had so discouraged the larger engines, it went more slowly. However, it still kept saying, "I—think—I—can, I—think—I—can." It reached the top by drawing on bravery and then went on down the grade, congratulating itself by saying, "I thought I could, I thought I could."

A Disney version of the story was published in 1976:

The story begins with a toy-filled train pulled by a small red engine on its way to a town on the other side of a mountain but the engine shortly breaks down upon reaching the mountain. The toy clown flags down other engines to help them: a shiny yellow passenger engine, a big black freight engine, and a rusty old engine. The shiny passenger engine and big freight engine both refuse to help them and the rusty old engine is too tired and must rest. Finally, a little blue engine arrives. Although she is simply a switcher engine and has never been over the mountain, she agrees to help pull the train. In the end, she was able to successfully reach the top of the mountain before slowly heading down towards the town.

Versions

Later versions would revamp the story to have a more specific appeal for children – the stranded train is recast as a train of good food and anthropomorphic toys for the children across the mountain, thus in saving the train the little engine seems to be working for the benefit of the child reader, making the successful deed all the more triumphant.

In these versions another character appeared and remained a key part of the story hereafter – the clown ringleader of the toys who attempts to find help with several locomotives but is rebuffed. The number of engines in the story also eventually became standard across the tellings: The happy locomotive on the toy train who breaks down and cannot go on, the pompous passenger engine who considers himself too grand for the task, the powerful freight engine who views himself as too important, and the elderly engine who lacks either the strength or determination to help the toys. The little blue engine always appears last and, although perhaps reluctant (some editions have the engine clarify her role as a switcher not suited for excursions), always rises to the occasion and saves the day for the children over the mountain.

Each engine is defined by its appearance or function and is not given a name or personality beyond its role on the railroad. It is only in the 1991 film adaption that the engines' personalities are expanded on, including the granting of names: Farnsworth (the express engine), Pete (the freight engine), Georgia (the friendly engine of the toy train), Jebediah (the elderly engine) and Tillie, the titular "little engine that could". The clown was also named "Rollo" and a sixth engine character, Doc, appeared briefly to recover the broken-down Georgia and thus tie up the hanging story-thread of what happened to the failed engine of the toy train, which all other versions leave unaddressed. The 2011 adaptation expanded the storyline, this time with the little engine now working in DreamLand with Rusty (an old steam engine) alongside other Dream Haulers, trains that carried dreams to the real world while the original personalities of the previous locomotives absent from this version.

Films

The tale with its easy-to-grasp moral has become a classic children's story and was adapted in January 1991 as a 30-minute animated film produced in Wales and co-financed in Wales and the United States. The film named the famous little engine Tillie and expanded the narrative into a larger story of self-discovery.

In March 2011, the story was adapted as a 3-D film named The Little Engine That Could, produced by Universal Studios and featuring the voices of Whoopi Goldberg, Jamie Lee Curtis, Alyson Stoner, and Corbin Bleu.

Song

Burl Ives recorded the story told as a song "The Little Engine That Could" written by Gerald Marks and Milton Pascal with an orchestra directed by Percy Faith.  The song was released on the album Burl Ives Sings Little White Duck and Other Children's Favorites in 1964.

"Little Engine" toys and rail tours 
From 2005 to 2008, a full-size replica of the Little Engine That Could made an annual circuit around the United States. Arranged through Rail Events, Inc., a number of tourist and museum railroad operations hosted the "I Think I Can" Rail Tour. The replica was constructed in 2005 by the Strasburg Rail Road in southeast Pennsylvania who also constructed the Thomas The Tank Engine replicas that tour the United States. The last tour was in 2008. In 2009, the replica only appeared at the Texas State Railroad. In 2011, the website for the tour said that there would be dates announced for 2011, but dates were never posted and the message was still present in 2012 until it went offline. The last time the train ever operated was on September 16, 2012. As of 2015, the replica is owned by the Great Smoky Mountains Railroad, and has since been repainted to remove all references to the Little Engine That Could. It is currently displayed at the depot. Reasons for why the tour stopped are unknown.

American toy company Whittle Shortline produces wooden toy trains of The Little Engine That Could as a domestic alternative to Thomas the Tank Engine. Maxim Enterprise held the license prior to 2006.

List of other Little Engine That Could books
The Little Engine That Could and the Big Chase
I Knew You Could!
And The Fire Rescue
Choo Choo Charlie Saves the Carnival
And The Snowy, Blowy Christmas
Good Night, Little Engine
Three Little Engines

Legacy
A 1949 recording of the story by Paul Wing was inducted to the National Recording Registry in 2009.

In popular culture 
 In the 1941 Disney movie Dumbo (as well as the Disneyland theme park ride), when Casey Jr. the circus train puffs up a hill, he chants, "I think I can!" and "I thought I could!" when going down the hill.
 The story is incorporated into the 1977 special The Easter Bunny Is Comin' to Town, in which the engine is named "Chugs" and is commissioned by the Easter Bunny to deliver Easter candy.
 This book was chosen by "Jumpstart Read for the Record" to be read worldwide to tens of thousands of children on August 24, 2006.
 Shel Silverstein wrote the poem "The Little Blue Engine", which referenced this story.
 A song version co-written by famed Looney Tunes writer Warren Foster was covered by the likes of John Denver, Burl Ives and Guy Lombardo.
 Variations of the story are also found in Choo-Choo, the Little Switch Engine by Wallace Wadsworth (published by Rand McNally) and in Peter Pan Records' Puff 'N Toot. In these stories, the titular locomotives are tasked with carrying their trains over a nearby steep mountain. Choo-Choo must substitute for a passenger engine who has broken down. Puff 'N Toot, carrying children to a summer campground, is unable to cross a damaged bridge, and must resort to using an old mountain track. The line "I think I can" is replaced with "I gotta make it" in this second story.
Eminem has a song named 'Little Engine' in his album Music To Be Murdered By. The song was heavily packed with references from the book.

See also
 The Little Engine That Could – The 1991 film adaptation of the book.
 The Little Engine That Could – The 2011 CGI film starring Alyson Stoner.
 Thomas the Tank Engine – A similar British character.

References

External links

The Little Engine That Could (1963 10-min film) at Internet Archive, by Coronet Films
Volume I of My Book House The Little Engine That Could starts on p. 193.

1930 children's books
American picture books
Children's books about rail transport
Fictional locomotives
Snowclones
United States National Recording Registry recordings
Book series introduced in the 1930s